Filippo Illuminato (21 August 193028 September 1943) was an Italian partisan who died attacking Nazi German troops during the Four days of Naples in World War II. He was posthumously awarded the Gold Medal of Military Valour, Italy's highest award for gallantry.

On 3 September 1943, the Allies and the Kingdom of Italy signed the Armistice of Cassibile. On 8 September, it became publicly known, and Nazi Germany reacted by attacking Italy, their former Axis ally. On 13 September, the Nazi military governor of Naples ordered disarmament, and a curfew, and threatened savage retaliation for any attack on his men. On 26 September, the city rose in insurrection (the Four days of Naples). When the Allies entered Naples on 1 October, the Nazis had gone.

Illuminato came from a poor Neapolitan family. After finishing elementary school, he took a job as an apprentice mechanic in a vehicle repair shop. His Gold Medal citation reads:

An English translation:

His name is commemorated in a street in Naples, Via Filippo Illuminato, and in a high school in Mugnano di Napoli, Scuola Filippo Illuminato.

References

1930 births
1943 deaths
People from Naples
Italian partisans
Recipients of the Gold Medal of Military Valor
Italian civilians killed in World War II
Child soldiers in World War II